Attadale (Gaelic: Attadal ) is a settlement and estate in Wester Ross, in the Highland council area of Scotland. It is on the southern shore  of Loch Carron, between the villages of Stromeferry and Strathcarron.

It is served by Attadale railway station on the Kyle of Lochalsh Line.

Mountains within the estate include two Munros - Lurg Mhòr and Bidein a' Choire Sheasgaich - as well as one Corbett - Beinn Dronaig.

References

Populated places in Ross and Cromarty
Highland Estates